The Winkler Index, sometimes known as the Winkler Scale or Winkler Regions, is a technique for classifying the climate of wine growing regions based on heat summation or growing degree-days. In the system, geographical areas are divided into five climate regions based on temperature converted to growing degree-days, and is commonly known as Regions I–V (see below).  The system was developed at the University of California, Davis by A. J. Winkler and Maynard Amerine.

The system
The system is based on both the hypothesis and observations that grapevines do not grow if the temperature is below 50 °F (10 °C). Each day during the growing season (assumed under the system to be April 1 through October 31 in the Northern Hemisphere; October 1 through April 30 in the Southern Hemisphere) are assigned growing degree-days according to the amount that the day's average temperature exceeds this threshold; one degree day per degree Fahrenheit over 50 °F (or with SI units, degrees Celsius over 10 °C is used). All days during the growing season are then added up (all negative values are set to zero), with the sum of the growing degree-days used to determine the region's classification in the original Winkler index as follows:

The system was originally developed for and is used officially in California and was based on the general ripening capabilities and wine styles that can be achieved in the climate due to heat accumulation (growing degree-days). The general ripening capabilities include hybrid grape varieties through early season, mid-season, and late season ripening V. Vinifera and even table grapes in the warmest areas of Region V. The general wine styles include lighter, more subtle wines with lower alcohol and brighter fruit aromas and flavors (including Champagne and other sparkling wines) found in cooler climates (Regions Ia, Ib, II and lower III) to bolder, bigger wines often with higher alcohol and lush, darker fruit aromas and flavors that are found in warmer climates (Region III, IV and V). Region V was stated as also having a tendency to be more suitable to higher production wines, Sherry and other fortified wines.

One issue with the original work done by Amerine and Winkler was that it did not specify a lower class limit for Region I (originally 2500 or less) or an upper class limit for Region V (originally 4000 or greater). Subsequent research using high resolution spatial climate data identified these limits for California, Oregon, Washington and Idaho, along with Australia. The results provided a lower bound to Region I of 1500 F° units (850 C° units) and an upper bound to Region V of 4900 F° units (2700 C° units). Furthermore, additional research in other wine regions found that Region I was best divided into a Region Ia (very early ripening varieties, mostly hybrid grapes) and Region Ib (early ripening varieties, mostly V. Vinifera).

The Winkler Index is also widely used in many other growing regions in the United States, such as Oregon and Washington, along with Canada, South America, Australia, New Zealand, South Africa, and Europe. However, it is less widely used in Europe where the Huglin index is favored. The Huglin index uses a similar formula but gives more weight to maximum temperatures and uses an adjustment for longer day lengths found at higher latitudes. It is also functionally similar to growing season average temperatures (simple average of temperatures across the seven month growing season).

Application
The table below provides examples of the ripening and wine style concept used in the application of the Winkler Index for numerous wine regions globally. Region Ia are the coolest areas with known regions including Champagne, Central Otago, and Valais. Region Ia also includes numerous newer regions growing grapes and making wine including southern England, areas in northern Europe, Nova Scotia, and southern areas of Chile and Argentina. Region Ia areas ripen a range of hybrid grapes and some very early ripening V. Vinifera. Region Ib is slightly warmer, can ripen early varieties such as Chardonnay, Pinot noir, Sauvignon blanc or Riesling with characteristic locations within the Rhine and Mosel valleys, Burgundy and the Loire Valley, or the Willamette Valley in Oregon as good examples. Region II includes cooler locations within areas such as Bordeaux, Coonawarra, and Valle de Curicó in Chile. Warmer areas in these wine regions fall in a Winkler Region III as do much of the Northern Rhône, Rioja, Umbria, and the Margaret River. Region IV includes portions of the Napa Valley, Stellenbosch, Corsica, Tuscany, and Alentejo where the warmer climates allow for the ripening of later varieties such as Cabernet sauvignon, Sangiovese, and Syrah. The warmest areas are found in Region V and include areas in the central valley of California, inland Australia and wine producing regions in Morocco, Madeira, Apulia, and Jerez.

Issues and limitations
There are numerous issues and limitations associated with the use of growing degree-days. First, the Winkler index and its classification of climate regions by growing degree-days only describe one aspect of an area's climate—mean daily temperature. Many other important factors which contribute to a region's suitability for viticulture (and its terroir) are excluded; among them sun exposure, latitude, precipitation, soil conditions, and the risk of extreme weather which might damage grapevines (e.g., winter freezes, spring and fall frosts, hail, etc.). As originally developed the climates of California were defined for relatively large areas using only one or two climate stations. This macroscale approach will invariably not capture the microscale influences that are an important aspect of growing any crop. To address these issues research has been increasingly using spatial climate data to better depict within region and even within vineyard differences in climate and therefore ripening and wine style potential. To create spatially appropriate climate data numerous stations and/or sensors are used to collect data which can then be interpolated over the landscape due to known interactions with elevation, aspect, slope, and distance to the coast or other water bodies using Geographic Information Systems (GIS). Instead of depicting a region as all one Winkler region (Napa Valley AVA being a Region III for example), spatial data summaries show the Napa Valley having a full range of Winkler regions, 12% a Region II, 56% a Region III, and 30% a Region IV (whereas the table above shows one station in Napa, St. Helena as being a Region IV).

Other significant differences exist depending on the time period of the data and formula used for calculating growing degree-days. First, to be comparable growing degree-day numbers from various sources need to come from the same time period. Due to both a variable climate and climate change, a comparison of a ten-year period from the 1970s and the 2000s would be inappropriate as the variation and trends over time would make them incomparable. Furthermore, a sufficient time period is suggested to allow the averaging to smooth out some of the variability. The standard time period in use is the climatological normal period of 30 years, however if 30 years of data is not available then at the minimum five years should be used. However a five-year period is not directly comparable to a 30-year period. How data are averaged (i.e., hourly, daily, or monthly) is also very important. While weather stations today can average data to an hour, a minutes or even seconds, historical data used to calculate growing degree-days has been done mostly on daily or monthly averages (the table above was done using monthly climatological normals). Shorter term averaging to minutes, or more commonly hourly, arguably better reflects the true thermal effects on the crops, but will result in growing degree-day values that are lower than both daily and monthly. Monthly averaged data can be very problematic as it can underestimate heat accumulation during the first and last months of the growing season. Therefore, it is paramount that one know the time period that the growing degree-day values are calculated from so as to be comparable.

The Winkler index uses the standard method of calculating growing degree-days in viticulture and is based on using a base temperature of 50 °F (10 °C) with no upper temperature cut-off. The first issue is that 50 °F (10 °C) is not likely the best base temperature even though it is the most commonly used value. Even the early research on this topic stressed that the base temperature threshold for accumulation for early versus late budding varieties is likely strongly cultivar specific. Various research worldwide has pointed to base temperatures ranging from 39 to 45 °F (4 to 7 °C), but there has been little confirmation of these thresholds across numerous wine regions and for a wider range of varieties. At the other end of the formula, the calculation for growing degree-days used in viticulture and wine production does not normally use an upper cut-off. Conceptually an upper cut-off would be applied if the plant system stopped being photosynthetically active at some point due to heat stress from high temperatures. While this may be proven for some crops, there is not a universal number for an upper threshold for grapes so the majority of the published data for comparison purposes in viticulture and wine production does not limit maximum temperatures. This issue is problematic because many weather stations today have integrated the corn growing degree-day method in their software. The corn growing degree-day method uses both a base temperature adjustment and an upper threshold, neither of which are common in viticulture and wine production use, and can confound any comparison with published data using the simple average method.

Furthermore, more complex climate indices have been introduced to address perceived shortcomings in the Winkler index including the Huglin Index, the Biologically Effective Degree-Day Index, and the Multicriteria Climatic Classification system (Geoviticulture MCC). These indices attempt to account for day length and solar, frost, and drought variability that can be found in different locations. Each have been used in various research settings, but have some limitations to the general user in that some variables needed to calculate the indices are not readily available from all weather/climate stations and/or to the general public.

Overall each of these issues needs to be carefully considered when comparing growing degree-day values from published data in magazines, books, scientific articles, and even from growers in the same region.

See also 
Growing degree-day

Notes

Further reading
 
 
 
 
 
 
 Jones, G.V., Reid, R., and A. Vilks (2012). Climate, Grapes, and Wine: Structure and Suitability in a Variable and Changing Climate pp 109–133 in The Geography of Wine: Regions, Terroir, and Techniques, edited by P. Dougherty. Springer Press, 255 pp. 

Viticulture
Agricultural terminology
California wine
Climate of California
Climate and weather classification systems
Horticulture
University of California, Davis